Wen Yunsong, also known as Winston Wen is a Chinese businessman and current CEO of Unihub Global Networks, a Chinese networking company. He is the son of former Chinese Premier Wen Jiabao and thus a princeling. Mr. Wen was a principal of New Horizon Capital, a private equity fund.  He received his MBA from the Kellogg School of Management.

References

Living people
Wen Jiabao family
Chinese chief executives
Kellogg School of Management alumni
21st-century Chinese businesspeople
Year of birth missing (living people)